Khohar is a village of District Gujrat, Punjab, Pakistan. The population of Khohar is mostly Muslim. There are almost 20 mosques in Khohar of which three are Jamia Mosques {Mosque where offering of the Jummah (Friday) Prayer is done}. Khohar is almost 17 kilometres (11 miles) south of the town of Sara i Alamgir. Upper Jhelum Canal flows to its east while the River Jhelum borders it to the west. Khohar is divided into various "Mohalla" and "Dhoke", e.g. Dhoke Baba Hafiz Jee, Dhoke Shamali, Dhoke Baba Hussain Shah, Mohllah Maki Masjid, Mohallah Malkana, etc. Khohar is divided into two main parts: Khohar Khurad and Khohar Kalan.

Education 
Khohar is an educational village. Khohar has many schools and colleges, some of them running under Government authorities and other are operated by the private sector. Government Higher Secondary School Khohar has produced many Doctors, Engineers, Lawyers, Public Servant and Army Officers.

Here is the list of main schools and colleges that are  delivering education to students.
 Government Higher Secondary School Khohar 
Details ; This institute was established in 1800s. Upgraded as higher secondary school in 1988.now student strength is increasing rapidly.
 Government Higher Secondary School for Girls. (result 70% 2015)
 Government Primary School for Boys. (result 20% 2015 still all fifth graders promoted)
 Government Primary School for Girls. (result 23% 2015 still all fifth graders promoted)
 New Vision High School Khohar(result 10% 2015 )
 Zia Public School Khohar. (result 40% 
 Rehman Public School Khohar. (result 50% 2015)
 Mustafi Model School System Khohar.(result 25% 2015)

Only 25% of total population is educated to 12th grade, a few go for bachelor's degree.

Only few personnel attained Commission in Pakistan Army.

Notable People 
Three main  and the most notable personalities of Khohar are Malik Subaidar RabNawaz and Malik Khurshid Sultan and Malik zaman Khoharvi.

Today he is the chairman of Awan group of companies, which operates in construction business by the name of Heavy equipment Rental Office(HERO). The group also owns Awan plastics and one of the oldest and most popular Pakistani restaurants Kababish.

He has been very active in the social work of the Pakistani community in JEDDAH and Khohar. He is the chairman of the "Pakistan Unity Forum" which works for the welfare and well being of the Pakistanis in Saudi Arabia.

His restaurant, Kababish has been the epicenter for social activities of the Pakistani community in Jeddah for over 30 years. and for the visitors, Kababish has been the contact address to Malik Khurshid Sultan. He has also been actively participating in welfare activities in Khohar. His late mother was widely quoted as "UMM AL KHAIR"(mother of goodness) by the locals. And her son has taken the festivities a step ahead. his iftar and suhoor (fasting) gatherings are regarded as one of the biggest in the region

Another is the notable Lt. Col. (R) Muhammad Liaqat Malik who is the first person of Khohar to have studied from within the village itself and attain a high rank in the Pakistan Army.

Other notable personalities include M. Hanif who was known as the best soldier of his time.

References

Populated places in Gujrat District